Lorcan O'Herlihy (born 1959 in Dublin, Ireland) is an Irish-born American architect working in Los Angeles and the founding principal of Lorcan O'Herlihy Architects [LOHA]. He is the son of the actor Dan O'Herlihy. O'Herlihy was educated at California Polytechnic University (San Luis Obispo, California) and the Architectural Association in London, UK.

O’Herlihy spent his formative years working as a designer and associate at Kevin Roche John Dinkeloo and Associates, and at Steven Holl Architects where he was responsible for the AIA National Honor Award-winning Hybrid Building (Seaside, Florida). He worked at I. M. Pei and Partners in New York and Paris on addition to the Grand Louvre Museum.

O’Herlihy and LOHA have produced work that has been published in over 20 countries and recognized internationally with features in The New York Times, Wallpaper*, Metropolis, Architectural Record, Architectural Review, Architecture, Frame, Icon, Interior Design, among many more. O'Herlihy's eponymous monograph was published by Rockport Publications in 1999 and Amplified Urbanism, a publication about the firm's design philosophy, was published in 2017.

LOHA's work has received over 100 national and international design awards throughout the years including the AIA Los Angeles firm of the year. In 2004, the Architectural League of New York selected Lorcan O’Herlihy as one of the eight "emerging voices" in the United States. In 2009, O’Herlihy garnered the prestigious College of Fellows of the American Institute of Architects status. O’Herlihy has been nominated for the 2014 American Academy of Arts and Letters Award in Architecture, the 2019 Cooper Hewitt National Design Award, and the 2018 Marcus Prize in Architecture. In 2018, Lorcan received the AIACC Distinguished Practice Award and his firm LOHA was ranked the #1 Design Firm in the Country by Architect Magazine’s ARCHITECT50, an annual ranking of architecture firms in the United States.

And in 2021, Lorcan O'Herlihy, Founding Principal and Creative Director, FAIA, was named AIA Los Angeles Gold Medalist Recipient, an AIALA Presidential Honoree. The Gold Medal is the highest honor the AIALA bestows.

References

Architects from Dublin (city)
Cranbrook Academy of Art faculty
1959 births
Living people
Alumni of the Architectural Association School of Architecture